Madame Bovary is novel by Gustave Flaubert, published in 1856.

Madame Bovary may also refer to:

Films

Madame Bovary (1934 film), directed by Jean Renoir
Madame Bovary (1937 film), directed by Gerhard Lamprecht
Madame Bovary (1947 film), directed by Carlos Schlieper
Madame Bovary (1949 film), directed by Vincente Minnelli
Madame Bovary (1969 film), directed by Hans Schott-Schöbinger 
Madame Bovary (1991 film), directed by Claude Chabrol
Madame Bovary (2014 film), directed by Sophie Barthes

Other

Madame Bovary (opera), 1951 opera by Emmanuel Bondeville
Madame Bovary (1975 TV series), produced by the BBC and starring Francesca Annis as Emma
Madame Bovary (2000 TV series), a 2000 serial directed by Tim Fywell